Park Eun-Kyung(born January 25, 1975) is a South Korean field hockey player.  At the 2004 and 2008 Summer Olympics she competed with the Korea women's national field hockey team in the women's tournament.

References

External links
 

1975 births
Living people
South Korean female field hockey players
Field hockey players at the 2000 Summer Olympics
Field hockey players at the 2004 Summer Olympics
Olympic field hockey players of South Korea